Losna may refer to:

Places
Losna (island), an island in Solund municipality in Vestland county, Norway
Losna (lake), a lake in the municipalities of Ringebu and Øyer in Innlandet county, Norway
Loşna River, a headwater of the Negoiu river in Romania
Losna, Russia, a village in Smolensk, Russia

Other
Losna (mythology), the Etruscan moon goddess

See also
Losne, a commune in the Côte-d'Or department in eastern France